South Lakes is a census-designated place (CDP) in Matanuska-Susitna Borough, Alaska, United States. It was first listed as a CDP prior to the 2020 census, after the split of the former CDP of Lakes. It is part of the Anchorage, Alaska Metropolitan Statistical Area.

Geography
South Lakes is located east of Wasilla and west of Palmer; the CDP name refers to a chain of lakes forming the northern edge of the community. It is bordered to the north by the North Lakes CDP.

Demographics
As of the 2020 census, the population was 5,229, the sixth most populated CDP in the borough.

References

Anchorage metropolitan area
Census-designated places in Alaska
Census-designated places in Matanuska-Susitna Borough, Alaska